Manchester Platting was a parliamentary constituency in Manchester.  It returned one Member of Parliament (MP) to the House of Commons of the Parliament of the United Kingdom, elected by the first past the post system.

History

The constituency was created as a result of the Report of the Boundary Commission in 1917, when it was recommended to be called "Manchester Collyhurst". However, when the Representation of the People Bill to give effect to the commission's recommendations was debated in Parliament, the Government accepted an amendment to change the name to Platting. The new constituency came into effect at the 1918 general election. It was abolished for the 1950 general election.

Boundaries 
Although Parliament changed the name proposed by the Boundary Commission, they kept the boundaries as recommended. The constituency was defined as the Collyhurst, Harpurhey and Miles Platting municipal wards of the County Borough of Manchester, together with the part of the St Michael's municipal ward which was not included in the Exchange division. The St Michael's ward was divided along the Rochdale Road, the small area to the south-west including the High Street area being excluded.

Members of Parliament

Election results

Election in the 1910s

Elections in the 1920s

Elections in the 1930s

Election in the 1940s

Sources

References 

Parliamentary constituencies in Manchester (historic)
Parliamentary constituencies in North West England (historic)
Constituencies of the Parliament of the United Kingdom established in 1918
Constituencies of the Parliament of the United Kingdom disestablished in 1950